Rheumatic Disease Clinics of North America is a medical journal addressing topics in rheumatology.

See also

Best Practice & Research: Clinical Rheumatology

Rheumatology journals
Publications established in 1987
English-language journals
Quarterly journals
Elsevier academic journals